Todd Shipyards F.C. was an American soccer club based in Brooklyn, New York that was an inaugural member of the American Soccer League. The team was formed when the Todd Shipyard company decided to merge the Brooklyn Robins Dry Dock with Tebo Yacht Basin F.C.

Year-by-year

References

Men's soccer clubs in New York (state)
Defunct soccer clubs in New York City
American Soccer League (1921–1933) teams
1921 establishments in New York City
Association football clubs established in 1921
Sports in Brooklyn
Works soccer clubs in the United States